James Hirschfeld may refer to:
 James Hirschfeld (chief executive), co-founder and CEO of Paperless Post
 James William Peter Hirschfeld, Australian mathematician
 Jimmy Hirschfeld, television director and producer